This is a complete list of current bridges and other crossings of the Monongahela River starting from Pittsburgh, Pennsylvania, where the river helps to form the headwaters of the Ohio River, and ending in Fairmont, West Virginia, where the West Fork River and Tygart Valley River combine to form the Monongahela.

Pennsylvania

West Virginia

See also
 
 
 
 List of crossings of the Ohio River

Monongahela River
Monongahela
Crossings of the Monongahela River